Federal University of Pernambuco (UFPE) is a public university in Recife, Brazil, established in 1946. UFPE has 70 undergraduate courses and 175 postgraduate courses. , UFPE had 35,000 students and 2,000 professors. The university has three campuses: Recife, Vitória de Santo Antão, and Caruaru. Its main campus, Campus Reitor Joaquim Amazonas, is located in western Recife, in the Cidade Universitária neighborhood. The Recife Law School, established in 1827, is located downtown.

UFPE ranks among the top Brazilian universities, placing ninth in the country in size and scientific production, and seventh among the federal public universities. UFPE's Center for Exact and Natural Sciences is consistently the strongest in research production in the university.

UFPE has twice elected the best university in Northern and Northeastern Brazil by Guia do Estudante and Banco Real (ABN AMRO).

Each year over 6,000 seats are offered in its vestibular. The median and average competition rate is of about 10 applicants for each seat.

History 
Olinda Law School can be considered UFPE's precursor. It was created by Pedro I and is, along with the University of São Paulo Law School, founded on the same day, the law school in the country. Afterwards, it was transferred to Recife. In 1895 the School of Engineering of Pernambuco also started to function. These two faculties/free schools, and those of Medicine (1927), Philosophy currently known as Faculdade Frassinetti do Recife - FAFIRE (1941) and Belas Artes (1932), became the base courses to UFPE's formation.

On 11 August 1946, the University of Recife was created, one of the first university centers of the North and Northeast of Brazil.

In 1948, the construction of the university's campus starts. The discussion about the construction's site started a year before that. Between the cogitated places were terrains in the neighborhoods of Joana Bezerra, Santo Amaro and Ibura, the Faculty of Law's area, in Recife's centre; and a lot in Várzea, the same place where the Engenho do Meio functioned before and where the university is located nowadays. This choice was made in function of a project to the construction of an avenue in the place. Climatic conditions and the topography of the terrain were also considered.

The resources given in the acquisition and implantation of the university's campus were provenient of the state's government, that allocated 0,10% of sale taxes and consignations to the project's edification. The first buildings to be built on campus were the vivarium, a space dedicated to animal farming, that used to be located in the area which nowadays the Department of Nutrition and the Center of Health Sciences are located. The campus architectonic project's conception was made by a Venezian architect named Mário Russo.

In 1965, the University of Recife became the Federal University of Pernambuco (UFPE), authority tied to MEC.

University's Campi

Campus Reitor Joaquim Amazonas (Recife) 
UFPE has an urban campus of research in Cidade Universitária (west zone of Recife) with an area of 149 hectares, officially named Campus Universitário Reitor Joaquim Amazonas.

The central administration is located in the campus, along with nine of the ten academic centers headquartered in Recife, sixty seven departments, the Colégio de Aplicação, the Central Library, ten sectorial libraries, the Center of Information Technology, the University's Publisher, the Center of Physical Education and Sports, the Center of Hospitality and Tourism, Keizo Azami's Immunopathology Laboratory and the Hospital das Clínicas. It also holds the Centro de Convenções and Concha Acústica. Between UFPE's natural areas, the main one is the Cavouco stream.

The Center of Juridic Sciences (Faculdade de Direito do Recife), the Center of Juridic Practices, the Center of Continued Education, the Center of Radio and Television, the Pernambuco's Memorial of Medicine and Benfica's Cultural Center are all located in Recife's centre.

Campus of Caruaru 
Headquartering the Academic Center of Agreste, that in its first years functioned provisionally in the Commercial Polo of Caruaru, holds classrooms, a library, an informatics lab and courses' coordinations.

In 2009, the Academic Center of Agreste had all of its activities transferred to the definitive campus.

Courses

The Academic Center of Agreste offers 11 courses.
 Business Administration and Management
 Economic Sciences
 Design
 Social Communication
 Civil Engineering
 Production Engineering
 Physics (licentiate)
 Medicine
 Chemistry (licentiate)
 Pedagogy

Campus of Vitória 
The Academic Center of Vitória, headquartered in Vitória de Santo Antão, functions in installations donated by the Town Hall, an old building from 1927, that held a hospital and an agrotechnic school, divided in three blocks: an administrative block (Tabocas) and two blocks dedicated to education (Pirituba and Bela Vista).

Courses
 Biological Sciences (licentiate)
 Physical Education (licentiate and bachelor's degree)
 Nursing
 Nutrition
 Collective Health

Undergraduate and graduate programs 
UFPE offers more than 90 undergraduate programs and 198 post-graduate programs, with about 40,000 students and 2,000 professors.

UFPE's first post-graduate programs were created in 1967. Since then, there's been a quantitative and qualitative evolution. Of the four initial master's degrees (Mathematics, Biochemistry, Economy and Sociology), the university currently has 71, 45 doctorates and 64 specialization programs, in the areas of Human Sciences, Literature and Arts; Technology, Exact and Natural Sciences, Biological Sciences and Health Sciences.

Structure 
UFPE is divided in centers, where the departments are located, counting with supplementary organs for administrative, cultural and academical support.

Centers

See also
Brazil University Rankings
Universities and Higher Education in Brazil

References
http://acertodecontas.blog.br/educacao/burocracia-desorganizao-e-falta-de-respeito-o-dia-a-dia-na-ufpe/
http://ne10.uol.com.br/canal/vestibular/noticia/2011/02/17/covest-entrega-documentos-ao-mpf-257768.php
http://pe360graus.globo.com/educacao/educacao-e-carreiras/vestibular/2011/02/09/NWS,528864,35,337,EDUCACAO,885-ERRO-NOTA-IMPEDE-ESTUDANTES-FAZER-MATRICULA-UFPE.aspx

External links

  
Center of Technology and Geosciences of UFPE 
Center of Biological Science of UFPE 
Center of Informatics of UFPE 
Physics Department of UFPE 
 Undergraduate Mathematical Sciences classes of UFPE 

 
Educational institutions established in 1946
1946 establishments in Brazil
Federal universities of Brazil
Universities and colleges in Recife